The 2013 Portland Timbers season was the 3rd season for the Portland Timbers in Major League Soccer (MLS), the top flight professional soccer league in the United States and Canada.

Background

Caleb Porter was announced as the Timbers head coach on August 29, 2012, but finished out coaching his final year at the University of Akron.  He was introduced as the head coach on January 8, 2013.

Competitions

Major League Soccer

Preseason

Desert Friendlies

Portland Timbers Tournament

Regular season

MLS Cup Playoffs

Western Conference standings

Updated to matches played on September 25, 2013 01:00 EDTSource: gue Soccer (MLS), the top flight MLSSoccer.com(W1) = Western Conference champion; (WC) = Qualifies for playoffs via wild-card. Only applicable when the season is not finished: (Q) = Qualified for the MLS Cup Playoffs, but not yet to the particular round indicated; (E) = Eliminated from playoff contention.

Overall standings

Results summary

Results by round

U.S. Open Cup

Cup bracket

Cascadia Cup

The Cascadia Cup is a trophy that was created in 2004 by supporters of the Portland Timbers, Seattle Sounders FC and Vancouver Whitecaps FC. It is awarded to the club with the best record in league games versus the other participants.

Friendlies

2013 MLS Reserve League

Reserve League Schedule

Club

Kits

Executive staff

Coaching staff

Squad

Roster and Statistics

All players contracted to the club during the season included.

Goalkeeper stats

Last updated: October 27, 2013

Player Recognition

MLS Coach of the Year

MLS Goalkeeper of the Year

MLS Newcomer of the Year

2013 MLS Best XI

MLS Xbox Individual Fair Play Award

2013 MLS All-Star Game

MLS Player of the Week

MLS Goal of the Week

MLS Goal of the Year

MLS Save of the Week

MLS Save of the Year

MLS Top 3 Performers

MLS Team of the Week

MLS WORKS Humanitarian of the Month

Thecup.us U.S. Open Cup Player of the Round

North American Soccer Reporters Player of the Week

ProSoccer Talk Player of the Week

Player movement

Transfers in

Loans in

Loans out

Transfers out

Supplemental Draft Picks

Unsigned Trialists

Miscellaneous

International Roster Slots

References

2013
Portland Timbers
Portland Timbers
Portland Timbers
Port